São Paulo de Olivença is a community and a municipality near the western edge of the state of Amazonas near the tri-country border area in Brazil. The population is 40,073 (2020 est.) in an area of 19,746 km². The city is served by Senadora Eunice Michiles Airport. This city, along with other surrounding cities, is known for their sand export for the making of cement.

History
It was founded in 1689 as a mission by Spanish Jesuit Samuel Fritz. The municipality of Santo Antônio do Içá, located to the north, was separated from this municipality in 1955. In 2010, the city suffered from a severe landslide, causing road damage. No one was injured or killed, but many homes were lost in the Amazon River.

References

External links
  São Paulo de Olivença on citybrazil.com.br

Municipalities in Amazonas (Brazilian state)
Populated places on the Amazon